Touba may refer to:
Touba, Boké, a town in Guinea
Touba Department, a department in Ivory Coast
Touba, Ivory Coast, a town in Ivory Coast
Touba, Labé, a town in Guinea
Touba, Mali, a town in Mali
Touba, Senegal, a city in Senegal